Following is a list of dams and reservoirs in Vermont.

All major dams are linked below.

Dams and reservoirs in Vermont

This list is incomplete.  You can help Wikipedia by expanding it.

 Ascutney Mill Dam, Mill Pond, privately owned
 Ball Mountain Dam, Ball Mountain Lake, United States Army Corps of Engineers
 Frank D. Comerford Dam, Comerford Reservoir, TransCanada Corporation (on New Hampshire border)
 Lake Dunmore Dam, Lake Dunmore, Central Vermont Public Service Corp.
 East Barre Dam, Jail Branch River (seasonal reservoir), state of Vermont
 Green River Dam, Green River Reservoir, village of Morrisville
 Green River Crib Dam, in Guilford
 Harriman Dam, Harriman Reservoir, TransCanada Corporation
 Indian Brook Dam, Indian Brook Reservoir, town of Essex
 McIndoes Falls Dam, McIndoes Reservoir, TransCanada
 Moore Dam, Moore Reservoir, TransCanada Corporation (on New Hampshire border)
 North Hartland Dam, North Hartland Lake, USACE
 Union Village Dam, Ompompanoosuc River (seasonal reservoir), USACE
 Somerset Reservoir Dam, Somerset Reservoir, Somerset Water Department
 Townshend Dam, Townshend Lake, USACE
 Waterbury Dam, Waterbury Reservoir, USACE
 Wrightsville Dam, Wrightsville Reservoir, Winooski River (seasonal reservoir), State of Vermont

References 

Vermont
Dams
Dams